Florence Turner (January 6, 1885 – August 28, 1946) was an American actress who became known as the "Vitagraph Girl" in early silent films.

Biography
Born in New York City, Turner was pushed into appearing on the stage at age three by her ambitious mother. Turner became a regular performer in a variety of productions. In 1906, she joined the fledgling motion picture business, signing with the pioneering Vitagraph Studios and making her film debut in How to Cure a Cold (June 8, 1907).

At the time there were no stars per se, unless an already famous stage star made a movie. Performers were not even mentioned by name. Long, drawn out screen credits were non-existent. There was nothing but the name of the company and the picture. As the content of movies evolved from simple incidents or situations into definite stories, some of the heroes and heroines were conceded a vague identity, such as the "Edison Girl", etc.

Though she was known only as the "Vitagraph Girl" in the early motion picture shorts, Turner became the most popular American actress to appear on screen (which at that time was still dominated by French pictures, especially from the Pathe and Gaumont companies). Her worth to the studio, as its biggest box-office draw, was recognised in 1907 when her pay was upped to $22 a week, as proto-star plus part-time seamstress. It was somewhat less than the male leading players, especially those with stage experience, particularly the super-popular Maurice Costello. In March 1910, she and Florence Lawrence became the first screen actors not already famous in another medium to be publicized by name by their studios to the general public.

Later that year, Florence was paired several times with heartthrob Wallace Reid, who was on his way to stardom. But with the rise of more stars such as Gene Gauntier and Marin Sais at Kalem Studios, Marion Leonard and Mary Pickford at Biograph Studios, and Florence Lawrence (Biograph, moving to IMP in 1910), Florence Turner was no longer quite as special. By 1913 she was looking for new pastures and left the United States accompanied by longtime friend Laurence Trimble, who directed her in a number of movies. They moved to England, where she and Larry began performing together in London music halls.

Turner sometimes wrote screenplays and directed her own movies, including a number of comedies. She also organized her own production company, Turner Films, for which she made more than thirty shorts. These were shot at the Walton Studios of Cecil Hepworth, west of London.

Turner entertained Allied troops during World War I. She returned to the U.S. after the Armistice, but was not as successful as before. In 1920, she again went to England, where she remained until moving to Hollywood, virtually forgotten, in 1924.

By then she was thirty-nine years of age, and her starring days were long behind her. She continued to act in supporting roles into the 1930s.

In 1928, she acted in a minor role on Broadway in Sign of the Leopard, which ran for 39 performances. 

Turner was placed on the payroll at MGM by Louis B. Mayer in the 1930s, but was limited in the assignments offered. She mostly played bit or small parts and worked as an extra.

Last years
She later moved to the Motion Picture Country House, a retirement community for the industry in Woodland Hills, California. 

After appearing in more than 160 motion pictures, Turner died at 61 in Woodland Hills. She was cremated at a mortuary in Hollywood and, at her request, there was no funeral service. She was buried at Chapel of the Pines Crematory.

Film appearances 

How to Cure a Cold (1907, Short)
Athletic American Girls (1907, Short)
Bargain Fiend; or, Shopping à la Mode (1907, Short)
Cast Up by the Sea (1907, Short)
The Gypsy's Warning (1907, Short)
Francesca di Rimini; or, The Two Brothers (1908, Short) as Francesca
Macbeth (1908, Short) as Banquet Guest
Romeo and Juliet (1908, Short)
Romance of a War Nurse (1908, Short)
Richard III (1908, Short)
Ex-Convict No. 900 (1908, Short)
An Unexpected Santa Claus (1908, Short)
Saved by Love (1908, Short) as The Banker's Daughter
The Merchant of Venice (1908, Short) as Jessica
A Daughter of the Sun (1909, Short)
A Midsummer Night's Dream (1909, Short)
Kenilworth (1909, Short)
King Lear (1909, Short) as Goneril
Fuss and Feathers (1909, Short)
Launcelot and Elaine (1909, Short) as Elaine
The Heart of a Clown (1909, Short)
A Pair of Schemers; or, My Wife and My Uncle (1910, Short) as The Wife
Twelfth Night (1910, Short) as Viola
Ranson's Folly (1910, Short)
For Her Sister's Sake (1910, Short)
St. Elmo (1910, Short) as Edna Earle
Sisters (1910, Short)
Over the Garden Wall (1910, Short)
Wilson's Wife's Countenance (1910, Short)
Davy Jones and Captain Bragg (1910, Short)
Uncle Tom's Cabin (1910, Short) as Topsy
Peg Woffington (1910, Short) as Peg Woffington
Her Mother's Wedding Gown (1910, Short) as The Daughter
Back to Nature; or, The Best Man Wins (1910, Short) as The Consul's Daughter
Rose Leaves (1910, Short)
Jean the Match-Maker (1910, Short)
Renunciation (1910, Short)
Brother Man (1910, Short)
Auld Robin Gray (1910, Short) as Jenny
In the Mountains of Kentucky (1910, Short)
Jean Goes Fishing (1910, Short)
Francesca da Rimini (1910, Short) as Francesca da Rimini
Love, Luck and Gasoline (1910, Short) as The Passenger
The Winning of Miss Langdon (1910, Short) as Miss Langdon
A Tin-Type Romance (1910, Short) as Beth
A Dixie Mother (1910, Short)
Jean Rescues (1911, Short) as Alice
The New Stenographer (1911, Short) as The New Stenographer
A Tale of Two Cities (1911, Short) as Lucie Manette
Captain Barnacle's Courtship (1911, Short) as Ivy Leach
For His Sake; or, The Winning of the Stepchildren (1911, Short) as The Wife
The Spirit of the Light; or, Love Watches on Through the Years (1911, Short) as The Painter's Wife
Prejudice of Pierre Marie (1911, Short) as Babette - Pierre's Wife
The Show Girl (1911, Short) as Mrs. Renfrew
The Sacrifice (1911, Short) as Mrs. Downes
Proving His Love; or, The Ruse of a Beautiful Woman (1911, Short) as Alice Gordon
The Stumbling Block (1911, Short) as Florence
Intrepid Davy (1911, Short)
Birds of a Feather (1911, Short) as Mrs. Sutherland
The Wrong Patient (1911, Short) as Cissy Morgan
The Thumb Print (1911, Short) as Minor Role (uncredited)
Jealousy (1911, Short)
Cherry Blossoms (1911, Short) as Dollie - the Absent-Minded Sweetheart
Forgotten; or, An Answered Prayer (1911, Short) as Mrs. Earle - the Mother
The Answer of the Roses (1911, Short) as Nina
Wig Wag (1911, Short) as Mrs. Van Duyn - the Mother
Auld Lang Syne (1911, Short) as Jennie
Hypnotizing the Hypnotist (1911, Short)
One Touch of Nature (1911, Short) as Helen Grochberg - the Jewish Daughter
A Red Cross Martyr; or, On the Firing Lines of Tripoli (1912, Short) as Marie Petrini
The Path of True Love (1912, Short) as The Country Girl
Jean Intervenes (1912, Short) as Florence Hart
Indian Romeo and Juliet (1912, Short) as Ethona / Juliet
Mrs. Carter's Necklace (1912, Short)
Her Diary (1912, Short) as Mrs. Swanson - a Widow
Aunty's Romance (1912, Short) as Doris Myhtle
Wanted... a Grandmother (1912, Short) as Kitty Mallory
Flirt or Heroine (1912, Short) as Jean Harley
Two Cinders (1912, Short) as Miss Scott
The Loyalty of Sylvia (1912, Short) as Sylvia
A Vitagraph Romance (1912, Short) as Herself
The Irony of Fate (1912, Short) as Virginia Jameson
She Cried (1912, Short) as Mame
When Persistency and Obstinacy Meet (1912, Short) as Dorothy Ellis
The Face or the Voice (1912, Short) as Myna Borden
Una of the Sierras (1912, Short)
The Servant Problem; or, How Mr. Bullington Ran the House (1912, Short) as Mrs. Fanny Bullington
Susie to Susanne (1912, Short) as Susie / Susanne
The Signal of Distress (1912, Short) as Dolly Dillard
While She Powdered Her Nose (1912, Short) as Betty Thompson
The Wings of a Moth (1913, Short) as Alice Wentworth
What a Change of Clothes Did (1913, Short)
Everybody's Doing It (1913, Short) as Grace Williams
Cutey and the Twins (1913, Short) as The Twins' Mother
The Skull (1913, Short) as Mrs. Jordan
Stenographer's Troubles (1913, Short) as The Boss's Wife
Under the Make-Up (1913, Short) as Pierrette
The One Good Turn (1913, Short) as The Anarchist's Wife
Sisters All (1913, Short) as Olga - a Poor Russian Dressmaker
The House in Suburbia (1913, Short) as June Trowbridge
Checkmated (1913, Short) as Betty Bartlett
Let 'Em Quarrel (1913, Short) as Maude - the Wife
A Window on Washington Park (1913, Short) as The Old Man's Daughter
The Deerslayer (1913, Short) as Hettty Hutter
Counsellor Bobby (1913, Short) as Jenny Holliday - the Daughter
Up and Down the Ladder (1913, Short) as Luella Pears
The Rose of Surrey (1913, Short) as Rose Moore
Jean's Evidence (1913, Short)
Pumps (1913, Short) as Mary Carter
The Younger Sister (1913, Short) as Peggy Wright
The Harper Mystery (1913, Short) as Margaret Kent
Creatures of Habit (1914, Short) as Flo
The Murdoch Trial (1914) as Helen Story
Flotilla the Flirt (1914, Short) as Flotilla
Daisy Doodad's Dial (1914, Short) as Daisy Doodad
For Her People (1914, Short) as Joan
Through the Valley of Shadows (1914) as Alice Cross
The Shepherd Lassie of Argyle (1914, Short) as Mary Lachan
Shopgirls: or, The Great Question (1914) as Judith
As Ye Repent (1915) as Marea
My Old Dutch (1915) as Sal Gray
Alone in London (1915) as Nan Meadows
Lost and Won (1915) as Barbar Weston
Far from the Madding Crowd (1915) as Bathsheba Everdene
A Welsh Singer (1915) as Mifanwy
Doorsteps (1916) as Doorsteps
Grim Justice (1916) as Chrystal Transom
East Is East (1916) as Victoria Vickers
Fool's Gold (1919) as Constance Harvey
Oh, It's E.Z. (1919, Short)
The Brand of Lopez (1920) as Lola Castillo
The Ugly Duckling (1920) as Charmis Graham
Blackmail (1920) as Lena
Three Men in a Boat (1920)
Passion Fruit (1921) as Nuanua
All Dolled Up (1921) as Eva Bundy
The Old Wives' Tale (1921) as Constance Barnes
The Little Mother (1922) as The Mother
The Street Tumblers (1922, Short) as Gypsy
The Lights o' London (1922, Short)
Was She Justified? (1922) as Joan Crossby
Hornet's Nest (1923) as Mrs. Cobb
Sally Bishop (1924) as Janet
The Boatswain's Mate (1924, Short) as Mrs. Walters
Women and Diamonds (1924) as Mrs. Seaton
Janice Meredith (1924) as Maid (uncredited)
The Mad Marriage (1925)
Never the Twain Shall Meet (1925) as Julia
The Price of Success (1925) as Mrs. Moran
The Dark Angel (1925) as Roma
The Gilded Highway (1926) as Mrs. Welby
The Last Alarm (1926) as Warehouse proprietor's wife
Flame of the Argentine (1926) as Doña Aguila
Padlocked (1926) as Mrs. Gilbert
The Overland Stage (1927) as Alice Gregg
The Broken Gate (1927) as Miss Julia
College (1927) as A Mother
Stranded (1927) as Mrs. Simpson
The Cancelled Debt (1927) as Mrs. Burke
Sally in Our Alley (1927) as Mrs. Williams
The Chinese Parrot (1927) as Mrs. Phillmore
The Law and the Man (1928) as Miss Blair
Marry the Girl (1928) as Miss Lawson
The Road to Ruin (1928) as Mrs. Canfield
Walking Back (1928) as Mrs. Schuyler (uncredited)
Jazzland (1928) as Mrs. Baggott
The Pace That Kills (1928) as Mrs. Bradley
Kid's Clever (1929) as Matron
The Iron Mask (1929) as Abbess (uncredited)
The Rampant Age (1930) as Mrs. Lawrence
King of Jazz (1930) as Minor (uncredited)
The Ridin' Fool (1931) as Ma Warren
Taxi (1931) as Trial Spectator (uncredited)
The Trial of Vivienne Ware (1932) as Juror (uncredited)
The Sign of the Cross (1932) as Christian (uncredited)
The Animal Kingdom (1932) as Minor Role (uncredited)
He Couldn't Take It (1933) as Elderly Lady (uncredited)
One Rainy Afternoon (1936) as Minor Role (uncredited)
Thousands Cheer (1943) as Mother at Train Station (uncredited)
Whistling in Brooklyn (1943) as Baseball Fan (uncredited) (final film role)

Other film credits
Through the Valley of Shadows (1914),  Scenario 
A Welsh Singer (1915), Producer 
As Ye Repent (1915), Story 
Caste (1915), Producer 
Far from the Madding Crowd (1915), Producer 
The Great Adventure (1915), Producer 
Grim Justice (1916), Producer 
 Sally in Our Alley (1916), Producer

Notes

References
 Higham, Charles. 1973. The Art of the American Film: 1900-1971. Doubleday & Company, Inc. New York; . Library of Congress Catalog Card Number 70-186026.
Morton, David. "'The Vitagraph Girl' or 'The Girl From Sheepshead Bay'?: Florence Turner Constructed as an Everywoman Matinee Idol", SensesofCinema.com. September 2017.

External links

Florence Turner at Women Film Pioneers Project
AFI Catalog Silent Films entry for Florence Turner
Literature on Florence Turner
1915 portrait, during the production of Far from the Madding Crowd

19th-century American actresses
American stage actresses
American film actresses
American silent film actresses
Screenwriters from New York (state)
Actresses from New York City
1885 births
1946 deaths
American women screenwriters
Burials at Chapel of the Pines Crematory
American women film directors
Writers from New York City
Film directors from New York City
20th-century American actresses
Women film pioneers
20th-century American women writers
20th-century American screenwriters